Daniel Phillips may refer to:

 Daniel Phillips (make-up artist), English special effects make-up artist
 Daniel Phillips (physicist), physicist at Ohio University
 Daniel Phillips (sailor) (born 1971), Australian Olympic sailor
 DJP (DJ) (Daniel James Phillips, born 1973), American DJ
 Daniel Phillips (footballer) (born 2001), English-Trinidadian footballer for Watford F.C.

See also
 Dan Phillips, American designer and builder